Olszewice  is a village in the administrative district of Gmina Sławno, within Opoczno County, Łódź Voivodeship, in central Poland. Its coordinates are 52 12' 00 N and 21 49' 00 W. Its neighbouring districts are Chroscice, Falbogi, Gojsc, Grodzisk, Kaluszyn, Kluki, Kruki, Mroczki, Mrozy, Rudka, Rudniki, Ryczolek, Szymony, Wasy, Wity.

References

Villages in Opoczno County